King's Endgame (Kraljeva završnica) is a 1987 Croatian film directed by Živorad Tomić.

Cast 
 Irfan Mensur - Branko Kralj
 Ena Begović - Višnja Kralj
 Vladislava Milosavljević - Irena
 Milan Štrljić - Inspektor
 Bogdan Diklić - Božo
 Ivo Gregurević - Prodavac pića u vozu
 Zdenko Jelčić - Kondukter
 Vlatko Dulić - Konobar
 Zvonimir Torjanac - Psihijatar
 Mirjana Majurec - Sekretarica
 Franjo Majetić - Prvi šahista
 Ivo Fici - Drugi šahista
 Ilija Ivezić - Temelj

References

Further reading

External links 

1987 films
Croatian crime drama films
1980s Croatian-language films
Yugoslav crime drama films
1987 directorial debut films